Karl Moline is a comic book artist and the co-creator (along with Joss Whedon) of Fray. He provided the artwork for Fray, as well as the associated Fray-centric story in Tales of the Slayers. In 2001 he signed an exclusive contract with CrossGen where he pencilled the horror book Route 666.

Following CrossGen's closure, he returned to mainstream comics providing pencils on a 2004 run of Marvel's Rogue and partnering with writer C. B. Cebulski on Marvel's limited series The Loners. In 2008 he returned to Dark Horse and Buffy to pencil the Fray storyline in Buffy the Vampire Slayer Season Eight #16-19 "Time of Your Life".

Bibliography

CrossGen
Scion #22 (2002)
Route 666 #1-4, 6–9, 11–14, 16–17, 19-22 (2002-2004)
Dark Horse Comics
Dark Horse Presents Vol. 1 #157 (2000)
Fray #1-7 (2001-2003)
Tales of the Slayers Original Graphic Novel (2002)
Buffy the Vampire Slayer Season Eight #16-19 (2008)
B.P.R.D. War of Frogs #3 (2009)
Buffy the Vampire Slayer: Willow Oneshot (2009)
Buffy the Vampire Slayer: Riley Oneshot (2010)
B.P.R.D. The Dead Remembers #1-3 (2011)
Buffy the Vampire Slayer Season Nine #5, 14–15, 20 (2012-2013)
Dark Horse Presents Vol. 2 #25-27 (2013)
Buffy the Vampire Slayer Season Ten #6 (2014)
DC Comics
R.E.B.E.L.S. Annual #1 (2009)
Supergirl #34 (2014)
Convergence: Superboy #1-2 (2015)
Harris Publications
Vampirella Strikes #3 (1995)
Marvel Comics
2099: World of Tomorrow #3-4 (1996)
Daredevil 2099 Oneshot (2004)
Rogue Vol. 2 #7-8, 10, 12 (2005)
Spider-Man Unlimited #7 (2005)
The Loners #1-5 (2007-2008)
X-Men Origins: Emma Frost (2010)
Nation X #3 (2010)
Avengers Academy #27-28 (2012)
Hulk Smash Avengers #3 (2012)
Avengers Arena #13-14, 16 (2013)
Disney Kingdoms: Seekers of the Weird #1-2, 4-5 (2014)
Mike Wolfer Entertainment
Widow: Progeny #1 (1997)
Valiant Comics
Unity #24-25 (2015)

See also 
 Fray
 Buffy the Vampire Slayer Season Eight

References

External links 
 

American cartoonists
Living people
Year of birth missing (living people)